Steffi Graf was the defending champion but did not compete that year.

Pam Shriver won in the final 6–3, 6–4 against Manuela Maleeva.

Seeds
A champion seed is indicated in bold text while text in italics indicates the round in which that seed was eliminated.

  Pam Shriver (champion)
  Helena Suková (second round)
  Manuela Maleeva (final)
  Claudia Kohde-Kilsch (semifinals)
  Katerina Maleeva (quarterfinals)
  Sandra Cecchini (first round)
  Nathalie Tauziat (first round)
  Raffaella Reggi (quarterfinals)

Draw

External links
 1988 European Indoors draw

Zurich Open
1988 WTA Tour